PhotoToMovie is slideshow software developed by LQ Graphics, Inc. that runs on Mac OS and Windows. It produces photo slideshows.

Overview 

PhotoToMovie slideshow software is one of the original slideshow applications providing the Ken Burns effect. Originally created in 2002, it preceded the Ken Burns effect in iMovie by a few years.

The video files it produces can be used online or burned to DVD. The application provides tools for adding motion effects (aka the Ken Burns effect), transitions, layouts, backgrounds, titles, graphics, and music.

It includes a specialized image processing algorithm to reduce or eliminate unwanted flickering/aliasing effects that occur during Ken Burns motion effects.

See also
 Slideshow
 Photo slideshow software
 Ken Burns effect

External links 
 Photo to Movie's official website
 Photo to Movie on Luminous Landscape
 LAFCPUG Review

Photo software
Presentation